Newland is a hamlet in the East Riding of Yorkshire, England. It is served by Eastrington railway station on the Hull to York Line.

It forms part of the civil parish of Eastrington. Newland lies within the Parliamentary constituency of Haltemprice and Howden an area that mainly consists of middle class suburbs, towns and villages. The area is affluent and has one of the highest proportions of owner-occupiers in the country.

In 1823 Newland (then New Land), was in the parishes of Eastrington and Howden, and the Wapentake and Liberty of Howdenshire.

References

Hamlets in the East Riding of Yorkshire